Leslie C. Cheng is an American mathematician specializing in harmonic analysis. She holds the Rachel C. Hale Chair in Mathematics at Bryn Mawr College.

Cheng did poorly in calculus in high school, and began her undergraduate studies at Bryn Mawr in 1988 intending to study the humanities. However, she was converted to mathematics by faculty member Rhonda Hughes and graduated with a bachelor's degree in mathematics in 1992. She went to the University of Pittsburgh for graduate study, completing her Ph.D. there in 1998. Her dissertation,  Estimates for Oscillatory Integral Operators, was supervised by Yibiao Pan.

After completing her doctorate, despite having offers for tenure-track faculty positions elsewhere, Cheng worked in temporary positions until getting an offer to return to Bryn Mawr in 2002. She was given the Rachel C. Hale Chair at Bryn Mawr in 2018 as recognition for her "commitment to her students, teaching excellence, and scholarship". Since June 2015, she was also a mentor for the "Class of 2019 Boston S.T.E.M. Posse".

References

Year of birth missing (living people)
Living people
21st-century American mathematicians
American women mathematicians
Bryn Mawr College alumni
University of Pittsburgh alumni
Bryn Mawr College faculty
21st-century American women